In geometry, an apeirogonal hosohedron or infinite hosohedron is a tiling of the plane consisting of two vertices at infinity. It may be considered an improper regular tiling of the Euclidean plane, with Schläfli symbol

Related tilings and polyhedra
The apeirogonal hosohedron is the arithmetic limit of the family of hosohedra {2,p}, as p tends to infinity, thereby turning the hosohedron into a Euclidean tiling. All the vertices have then receded to infinity and the digonal faces are no longer defined by closed circuits of finite edges.

Similarly to the uniform polyhedra and the uniform tilings, eight uniform tilings may be based from the regular apeirogonal tiling. The rectified and cantellated forms are duplicated, and as two times infinity is also infinity, the truncated and omnitruncated forms are also duplicated, therefore reducing the number of unique forms to four: the apeirogonal tiling, the apeirogonal hosohedron, the apeirogonal prism, and the apeirogonal antiprism.

Notes

References
 The Symmetries of Things 2008, John H. Conway, Heidi Burgiel, Chaim Goodman-Strass,

External links
Jim McNeill: Tessellations of the Plane

Apeirogonal tilings
Euclidean tilings
Isogonal tilings
Isohedral tilings
Regular tilings
Digonal tilings
Infinite-order tilings